Marlo Henderson was an American guitarist and saxophonist, who played in mainly blues and R&B genres. As a session musician he played on albums such as Off the Wall by Michael Jackson, Them Changes by Buddy Miles, Face to Face by Evelyn "Champagne" King, I Am. He also played on the "Girlfriend" song by Paul McCartney.

As a songwriter he co-wrote "Young, Willing and Able" with Minnie Riperton which appears on Petals: The Minnie Riperton Collection album. He also co-wrote "Strange Affair" with Riperton which appears on her Love Lives Forever album. Other compositions include "In The Morning" which appears on Táta Vega's Try My Love album and "Power in Your Love"  with Booker T. Jones and Michael Stokes.

He was also a producer.

Background

Personal life
Henderson was born in Alamogordo, New Mexico in 1948. He was supposed to be named Leroy Mario Henderson. A mistake on the birth certificate was made and the Mario part of his name became Marlo. He changed the more common spelling of Leroy to Leroi.

In the early 1970s he played on the We Got To Live Together Album by Buddy Miles. One of the tracks he also contributed backing vocals to was "Walking Down The Highway".
His musical legacy is survived by his youngest son multi instrumentalist Palo Roy Henderson, his Grandson producer and audio engineer Corwin Dewayne Henderson otherwise known as Swiffy Beats.
And his Granddaughter singer/songwriter and guitarist Patience Henderson.

Professional
In addition to being a session musician, he was also an arranger and producer whose work appeared on over 50 albums. During the 1970s he was a member of Stevie Wonder's back-up band Wonderlove. Also during the 1970s he was a member of the funk group Maxayn.

In the late 1990s he was involved in the production of Roscoe Lee Browne's Murmurs of the Heart album.

Death
He died at age 67 on 25 October 2015. Prior to his death he had been suffering from cancer.

References

African-American guitarists
American session musicians
2015 deaths
1948 births
20th-century American guitarists
20th-century African-American musicians
21st-century African-American people